Hypochrysops halyaetus, the western jewell, is a member of the family Lycaenidae of butterflies. It lives in Australia.

References

Luciini
Butterflies described in 1874
Butterflies of Australia
Taxa named by William Chapman Hewitson